Torsten George van Jaarsveld (born 30 June 1987) is a Namibian professional rugby union footballer. He plays mostly as a hooker or flanker. He is currently living in France and represents  in the French Top 14.

Career

Youth and Varsity Cup rugby

Van Jaarsveld was selected in the ' Under-18 side for the National Academy Week tournament in 2005. He was part of the Under-19 squad for the 2006 Under-19 Provincial Championship and the Under-21 squad for the Under-21 Provincial Championship in 2008.

Van Jaarsveld represented Pretoria-based university side  in the inaugural edition of the Varsity Cup in 2008, scoring their third ever try in the competition late in their opening-day 31–31 draw against . He made a total of eight appearances as he helped them to third spot on the log and a semi-final appearance in the competition, where they lost 44–47 to eventual winners . He also made in excess of 50 appearances for UP Tuks in the Blue Bulls' amateur Carlton League.

Pumas

Van Jaarsveld made a further three appearances off the bench during the 2009 Vodacom Cup competition before he established himself as a first-team regular during the 2009 Currie Cup First Division, playing in eleven of their matches during the competition. However, Van Jaarveld did pick up a personal accolade, winning the Pumas' Most Promising Player of the Year award.

This proved to only be a minor setback to Van Jaarsveld's career as he returned some five months later to play in the 2010 Vodacom Cup, making six appearances. After playing a further six matches during the 2011 Vodacom Cup competition, he had another full season playing in the Currie Cup Premier Division in 2011, which saw the Pumas being relegated to the First Division after a league restructure saw the Premier Division being reduced from eight teams to six.

Van Jaarsveld played in eight matches during the 2012 Vodacom Cup as they reached the semi-finals of this competition.

In a five-year career at the Pumas, Van Jaarsveld appeared in 73 matches and scored eight tries.

Free State Cheetahs / Cheetahs

He made two appearances for the  during the 2012 Vodacom Cup competition, being lauded by coach Joe Beukes, who said after his debut against the : "He was excellent against the Eagles. He has a lot of Brüssow in him. He defends well, is omnipresent at the breakdown and steal balls regularly".

In July 2014,  coach Rory Duncan announced that Van Jaarsveld would captain the side during the 2014 Currie Cup Premier Division season.

Bayonne

Van Jaarsveld joined French Pro D2 side  prior to the 2018–19 season on a two-year contract.

Representative rugby

In 2012, Van Jaarsveld was selected in a South African Barbarians (North) side that faced  during their 2012 tour of South Africa, suffering a 31–57 defeat.

In October 2014, Van Jaarsveld was called up to the n national team for the first time prior to their end-of-year tour to Europe.

References

External links
 

1987 births
Living people
Cheetahs (rugby union) players
Free State Cheetahs players
Namibia international rugby union players
Namibian Afrikaner people
Namibian rugby union players
Pumas (Currie Cup) players
Rugby union flankers
Rugby union hookers
Rugby union players from Windhoek
White Namibian people